Marielys Rojas (or Marierlis Rojas, born April 30, 1986) is Venezuelan athlete specializing in the high jump. Her personal best in the event is 1.90 meters achieved in 2008 in Ponce. This is the current national record.

Doping
On 27 October 2011, she was tested positive for the abuse of
Norandrosterone.  As a consequence, she was stripped of her silver medal
obtained in the high jump, event at the Pan American Games and declared to be ineligible to compete for two years until 21 November 2013.  Another source reports here disqualification as early as 16 July 2011
due to IAAF Rule 32.2.a.

Personal bests
High jump: 1.90 m –  Ponce, 29 March 2008
Triple jump: 12.59 m (wind: +1.6 m/s) –  Barquisimeto, 26 June 2004

Competition record

†: Disqualified because of doping.
‡: Might be disqualified because of doping (to be verified).

References

External links
 

1986 births
Living people
Venezuelan female high jumpers
Athletes (track and field) at the 2011 Pan American Games
Doping cases in athletics
South American Games gold medalists for Venezuela
South American Games silver medalists for Venezuela
South American Games medalists in athletics
Competitors at the 2002 South American Games
Competitors at the 2006 South American Games
Pan American Games medalists in athletics (track and field)
Pan American Games silver medalists for Venezuela
Medalists at the 2011 Pan American Games
People from Carabobo
20th-century Venezuelan women
21st-century Venezuelan women